Roverchiara is a comune (municipality) in the Province of Verona in the Italian region Veneto, located about  west of Venice and about  southeast of Verona.

The municipality of Roverchiara contains the frazione (subdivision) Roverchiaretta.

Roverchiara borders the following municipalities: Albaredo d'Adige, Angiari, Bonavigo, Isola Rizza, Ronco all'Adige, and San Pietro di Morubio.

Demographic evolution

References

External links
 www.comune.roverchiara.vr.it/

Cities and towns in Veneto